The Battle of Burkersdorf was a battle fought on 21 July 1762 during the Third Silesian War (part of the Seven Years' War). A Prussian army of 40,000 men fought an Austrian army of around 30,000 men.

After the death of Elizabeth of Russia, czarina of Russia, her nephew Peter III came to the throne. Peter was a great admirer of Frederick the Great and all things Prussian, and Frederick used this to his advantage. Peter promptly withdrew his army from the war, abandoned Russian-occupied East Prussia, and signed a treaty of peace with Frederick. Peter then sent a force to aid the Prussian army in the campaign against the Austrians.

Peter's reign was short-lived, however, as his wife Catherine the Great seized the throne, and he died shortly afterwards. Catherine withdrew from the war and sent orders for Count Zakhar Tchernyshov aiding the Prussians to withdraw.

Seeing the necessity of quick action, Frederick convinced the Russian general to stay for a few more days, not to take part in the battle, but to be a force acting on the Austrian general's decisions.  Frederick attacked and won, and the Russian force returned home.  Catherine's attempts to resume the war against Prussia were in vain, as peace talks were already being initiated at Hubertsberg.

References
 http://www.britishbattles.com/frederick/battle-burkersdorf.htm

Specific

External links
 

Battle of Burkersdorf
Battles of the Seven Years' War
Battles involving Prussia
Battles involving Austria
1762 in Austria
Battles of Frederick the Great
Battles of the Silesian Wars
History of Lower Silesian Voivodeship